Usagi Yojimbo Book 23: Bridge of Tears is the twenty-third graphic novel in the ongoing Usagi Yojimbo series created by cartoonist Stan Sakai. It was published by Dark Horse Comics in 2009, collecting stories previously published in Usagi Yojimbo (vol. 3) #94 – 102.

Bridge of Tears was published in trade paperback and limited edition hardcover (limited to 350 signed and numbered copies).

Publication details

Trade Paperback Edition 

Publication Date: July 15, 2009

Format: B&W, 248 pages, TPB, 

Price: $17.95

Signed & Numbered Limited Hardcover Edition 

Publication Date: July 29, 2009

Format: B&W, 248 pages, HC, 

Price: $59.99

Table of Contents 

 Introduction - Brian K. Vaughan
 Remnants of the Dead
 Shizukiri
 Boss Hamanaka’s Fortune 
 The Return of the Black Soul
 Bridge of Tears
 Fever Dream
 The Killer
 Cover Gallery
 Usagi Yojimbo #100 Roast
 Author Bio

Foreign Language Editions

Usagi Yojimbo 23: Most łez 

Publisher: Egmont Polska Sp. z o.o.

Publication Date:  Grudzień 2009

Language: Polish

Usagi Yojimbo nº 23: Puente de lágrimas 

Publisher: Planeta DeAgostini

Publication Date: Abril 2012

Language: Spanish

Usagi Yojimbo Tome 23 

Publisher: Paquet

Publication Date: Mars 2012

Language: French

Format: 12,5 x 18,5 cm

The Digest sized French editions of the Usagi Yojimbo books do not feature any of the individual compilation titles that are used for the original English editions, listing each book by volume number instead.

Usagi Yojimbo 23: Most slz 

Publisher: Crew

Publication Date: Únor 2015

Language: Czech

References

2013 graphic novels
Usagi Yojimbo